Brophy College Chapel is a chapel at Brophy College Preparatory, a Jesuit high school in Phoenix, Arizona. It was listed on the National Register of Historic Places in 1993.

History and architecture
The building was constructed in 1928 along with the original school as a donation from Mrs. William Henry Brophy in memory of her late husband. The Mission/Spanish Colonial Revival building was built from brick with stucco facing, along with clay tile for the roof. The chapel is a two and a half tall square building measuring 100x100 feet. Pilasters divide the building into vertical bays. It was designed by Lescher & Mahoney, architects who designed several other NRHP-listed buildings in Phoenix.

Interior architecture
The building's altar is pink tufa, quarried near Wickenburg, designed in a Mexican baroque style. A painting of the Holy Family by an unknown Italian artist of the 15th century is framed above. Inside the sacristy, a 1670 crucifix from the Monk's Cemetery at Evaux in France is hung.

Local blacksmiths built the heavily Spanish-inspired wrought iron chandeliers. Other metalwork includes the original Communion rail, moved after Vatican Council II to a side altar.

The stained glass windows were executed in Dublin, Ireland, by the artists of An Tur Gloine. All except one in the choir loft had been ordered by 1934; a local artist was commissioned to create this remaining window in 1985.

Parish use
In 1928, St. Francis was the second parish established in Phoenix. The Brophy chapel served the parish until 1959.

References

The NRHP nomination form (not available through NPS Focus)

External links

Roman Catholic churches in Phoenix, Arizona
National Register of Historic Places in Phoenix, Arizona
Properties of religious function on the National Register of Historic Places in Arizona
Roman Catholic churches completed in 1928
1928 establishments in Arizona
Mission Revival architecture in Arizona
University and college chapels in the United States
20th-century Roman Catholic church buildings in the United States